The National Order of Merit is a state order of the Gabonese Republic. The Order was instituted in 1971 and is awarded in five grades to both Gabonese and foreign nationals. It rewards civil and military services as well as professional practice dedicated to the State. The Grand Master of the Gabonese National Order of Merit is the Head of the Gabonese State.

Grades

Recipients
Among the recipients are:

 Pierre-Emerick Aubameyang
 Omar Bongo
 Ali Bongo Ondimba
 Paul Boundoukou-Latha
 Georges Catroux
 Manuel Corte-Real
 Michael Jackson
 Jean-Pierre Kelche
 Pascal Lamy
 Imelda Marcos
 Marie-Madeleine Mborantsuo
 Henri Minko
 Ben Moreell
 Séraphin Moundounga
 Charles-Ferdinand Nothomb
 Jean Ping
 Rose Christiane Raponda
 Louis Sanmarco
 Al Waleed bin Talal Al Saud
 Tristan Vieljeux

References

Orders, decorations, and medals of Gabon
Orders of merit
Awards established in 1971
1971 establishments in Africa